The National Indigenous Music Awards 2013 are the 10th annual National Indigenous Music Awards.

The nominations were announced on 7 July 2013 and the awards ceremony was held on 10 August 2013.

Michael Chugg from Chugg Entertainment said "NIMA has come a long way in a short time and is exceptional fertile ground for finding and breaking new indigenous artists. NIMA is gathering much respect both nationally and overseas for the professionalism it is bringing to the indigenous music scene." Shellie Morris, the best female musicians for 2004 and 2005 NT Music Awards, said "These awards are becoming more significant every year, it's a great time for Indigenous talent to gain recognition for their efforts. Artists and their management should use this as an opportunity that is knocking on their door right now."

In recognition of the 2013 passing of Dr Yunupingu, the evening concluded with a very special tribute to Yothu Yindi.

Performers
 Gurrumul Yunupingu - "Maralitja"
 Kahl Wallace & Jindhu Lawrie with special guest Bunna Lawrie (Coloured Stone)
 Shellie Morris - "Dots on the Shells"
 Kutcha Edwards & Dewayne Everettsmith - "Djäpana"
 Rrawun Maymuru from East Journey
 Grant Nundhirribala
 Djopla McKenzie
 Jimblah - "Fire"
 Rolku Band (Milingimbi) and the original members of Yothu Yindi & special guest David Gulpilil

Hall of Fame Inductee 
 Henry "Seaman" Dan, Wirrinyga Band, Archie Roach

Special Recognition Award 
 Gurrumul Yunupingu

Triple J Unearthed National Indigenous Winner
 Robbie Miller

Robbie Miller is a young Brisbane artist brought up to the sounds of Cat Stevens, Van Morrison and Neil Young and first picked up a guitar in 2002. His passion saw him graduate music from Queensland University of Technology in 2010 and has since developed his unique, solo sound. In 2013, he released the singles "Don't Go Walking Away" and "Oh Lord".

Awards
Artist of the Year

Best New Talent of the Year

Album of the Year

Film Clip of the Year

Song of the Year

Cover Art of the Year

Traditional Song of the Year

Community Clip of the Year

NT School Band of the Year

References

2013 in Australian music
2013 music awards
National Indigenous Music Awards